Isham Russell "Rusty" Jones II (April 13, 1942 – December 9, 2015) was an American jazz drummer.

Early life
Jones began playing drums at the age of thirteen and continued on throughout his college years, choosing traditional and modern jazz as his preferred mode of music. He went "on the road" after graduating college in 1965 from the University of Iowa with a degree in history and political science, to "get it out of his system", but he never stopped his pursuit of a musical vocation. He moved to the Chicago area in 1967.

Playing career
Jones appeared with Chicago singer Judy Roberts from 1968–72, soon after becoming a member of George Shearing's trio from 1972-78. Later years he accompanied pianist Marian McPartland for a few years and then freelanced throughout Chicago with several bands, touring the United States and Europe. He worked quite a bit with Adam Makowicz, Larry Novak, Patricia Barber, Frank D'Rone, Art Hodes, Ira Sullivan, J.R. Monterose, and Stéphane Grappelli.

Jones appeared quite regularly around the Chicago area with musicians from the young jazz scene in Chicago. He died in Chicago on December 9, 2015.

Notable family members
Jones' father was a saxophonist and his mother a vocalist (appearing under the name of Gretchen Lee) with most of their gigs being in and around the Chicago area. His mother was working at the Bismark Hotel in 1936 when the couple married. Other musicians in Jones' family were his grandfather, a trombonist/bandleader named Frank Jones, who worked in the Saginaw and Detroit area and his maternal uncle, Dean Herrick, an early artist on the Hammond organ.

The best known of these family musicians was Jones' great uncle, Isham Jones who became a renowned American bandleader/songwriter beginning with the 1920s and ending in 1936 when he initially retired. He wrote popular songs of the era such as, "It Had To Be You", "I'll See You In My Dreams", "The One I Love Belongs To Somebody Else", "Swingin' Down The Lane", "On The Alamo", "There Is No Greater Love", "We're In The Army Now" and several others.

References

External links

 All About Jazz
 Cimrecords.com
 Centre stage Chicago entry
 Modern Drummer article

1942 births
2015 deaths
American jazz drummers
Cool jazz drummers
Musicians from Chicago
American session musicians
Jazz musicians from Illinois
Musicians from Cedar Rapids, Iowa